S&B may refer to:
 Schmidt & Bender 
 S&B Foods, Japanese company